Brad Gilbert was the defending champion.

Amos Mansdorf won the tournament, beating Gilbert in the final, 3–6, 6–3, 6–4.

Seeds

  Jimmy Connors (semifinals)
  Brad Gilbert (final)
  Amos Mansdorf (champion)
  Peter Lundgren (semifinals)
  Stefan Eriksson (second round)
  Wolfgang Popp (quarterfinals)
  Barry Moir (first round)
  Gilad Bloom (quarterfinals)

Draw

Finals

Top half

Bottom half

References

 Main Draw

Tel Aviv Open
1987 Grand Prix (tennis)